The demographic characteristics of Cuba are known through census which have been conducted and analyzed by different bureaus since 1774. The National Office of Statistics of Cuba (ONE) since 1953. The most recent census was conducted in September 2012. The population of Cuba at the 2012 census was 11.2 million. The population density is 100.7 inhabitants per square kilometer, and the overall life expectancy in Cuba is 78.0 years. The population has always increased from one census to the next, with the exception of the 2012 census, when the count decreased by 10,000. Since 1740, Cuba's birth rate has surpassed its death rate; the natural growth rate of the country is positive. Cuba is in the fourth stage of demographic transition. In terms of age structure, the population is dominated (71.1%) by the 15- to 64-year-old segment. The median age of the population is 41.8, making it the oldest in the Americas, and the gender ratio of the total population is 0.99 males per female.

Population

According to the 2002 census, Cuba's population was 11,177,743, whereas the 2012 census numbered the population at 11,167,325. The drop between the 2002 and 2012 censuses was the first drop in Cuba's population since Cuba's war of independence. This drop was due to low fertility and emigration, as during this time (fiscal years 2003 to 2012), 332,028 Cubans received legal permanent residence in the United States. Consequently, Cuba is also the oldest country in the Americas in terms of median age, due to a high amount of emigration by younger Cubans to the U.S. In the last few years before the end of the wet feet, dry feet policy on January 12, 2017, the number of Cubans moving to the United States significantly outnumbered the natural increase during those years.

Population by region (2015)

Vital statistics

Structure of the population (2012) 

Structure of the population (01.07.2013) (Estimates):

Racial groups

Ancestral origins

According to the previous censuses, the Chinese were counted as white.
The ancestry of Cubans comes from many sources:

 Spanish

During the 18th, 19th and early part of the 20th century, large waves of Spanish immigrants from Canary Islands, Catalonia, Andalusia, Galicia, and Asturias emigrated to Cuba. Between 1820 and 1898, a total of 508,455 people left Spain, and more than 750,000 Spanish immigrants left for Cuba between 1899 and 1930, with many returning to Spain. There are 139,851 Spanish citizens living in Cuba as of 1 January 2018.

  Canary Islanders
  Catalans
  Andalusians
  Galicians
  Asturians

The Slave trade brought Africans to Cuba during its early history:
Between 1842 and 1873, 221,000 African slaves entered Cuba.

 Africans

People of the Americas:
 Haitians
 Jamaicans

Other European people that have contributed include:

 Germans
 French
 Portuguese
  Italians
 Russians

People from Asia:
 Chinese
 Koreans
 Filipino
 Lebanese,  Syrian,  Egyptian,  Palestinian (Arab Cubans)
Between 1842 and 1873, 124,800 Chinese arrived.

Genetics

An autosomal study from 2014 has found out the genetic average ancestry in Cuba to be 72% European, 20% African and 8% Native American with different proportions depending on the self-reported ancestry (White, Mulatto or Mestizo, and Black):

A 1995 study done on the population of Pinar del Rio, found that 50% of the Mt-DNA lineages  (female lineages) could be traced back to Europeans, 46% to Africans and 4% to Native Americans. This figure is consistent with both the historical background of the region, and the current demographics of it.

According to another study in 2008, the Native American contribution to present-day Cubans accounted for 33% of the maternal lineages, whereas Africa and Eurasia contributed 45% and 22% of the lineages, respectively. Haplogroup A2 is the main Native American haplogroup in Cuba (21.9% of the total sample), accounting for 67% of the Native American mtDNA gene pool. Regarding Y-chromosome haplogroups (male lineages), 78.8% of the sequences found in Cubans are of West Eurasian origin, 19.7% of African origin and 1.5% of East Asian origin. Among the West Eurasian fraction, the vast majority of individuals belong to West European haplogroup R1b. The African lineages found in Cubans have a Western (haplogroups E1, E2, E1b1a) and Northern (E1b1b-M81) African origin. The "Berber" haplogroup E1b1b1b (E-M81), is found at a frequency of 6.1%.

According to Fregel et al. (2009), the fact that autochthonous male North African E-M81 and female U6 lineages from the Canaries have been detected in Cuba and Iberoamerica, demonstrates that Canary Islanders with indigenous ancestors actively participated in the American colonization.

Y-DNA

mtDNA

Other demographics statistics

Demographic statistics according to the World Population Review in 2022.

One birth every 5 minutes	
One death every 5 minutes	
One net migrant every 45 minutes	
Net loss of one person every 48 minutes

Demographic statistics according to the CIA World Factbook, unless otherwise indicated.

Population
11,008,112 (2022 est.)
11,209,628 (2018)

Ethnic groups
White 64.1%, Mulatto or mixed 26.6%, Black 9.3% (2012 est.)

note: data represent racial self-identification from Cuba's 2012 national census

Age structure

0-14 years: 16.34% (male 929,927/female 877,035)
15-24 years: 11.81% (male 678,253/female 627,384)
25-54 years: 41.95% (male 2,335,680/female 2,303,793)
55-64 years: 14.11% (male 760,165/female 799,734)
65 years and over: 15.8% (male 794,743/female 952,348) (2020 est.)

0-14 years: 16.44% (male 940,787 /female 886,996)
15-24 years: 12.1% (male 698,220 /female 646,684)
25-54 years: 43.69% (male 2,443,190 /female 2,414,119)
55-64 years: 12.54% (male 677,304 /female 716,704)
65 years and over: 15.22% (male 773,636 /female 918,756) (2018 est.)

Median age
total: 42.1 years. Country comparison to the world: 37th
male: 40.2 years
female: 43.8 years (2020 est.)

total: 41.8 years. Country comparison to the world: 36th
male: 40.2 years 
female: 43.1 years (2018 est.)

Birth rate
10.11 births/1,000 population (2022 est.) Country comparison to the world: 188th
10.6 births/1,000 population (2018 est.) Country comparison to the world: 185th

Death rate
9.29 deaths/1,000 population (2022 est.) Country comparison to the world: 51st
8.9 deaths/1,000 population (2018 est.) Country comparison to the world: 63rd

Total fertility rate
1.71 children born/woman (2022 est.) Country comparison to the world: 163rd
1.71 children born/woman (2018 est.) Country comparison to the world: 170th

Net migration rate 
-2.92 migrant(s)/1,000 population (2022 est.) Country comparison to the world: 180th
-4.5 migrant(s)/1,000 population (2018 est.) Country comparison to the world: 188th

Population growth rate
-0.21% (2022 est.) Country comparison to the world: 211st
-0.27% (2018 est.) Country comparison to the world: 215th

Contraceptive prevalence rate
69% (2019)

Religions
Christian 58.9%, folk religion 17.6%, Buddhist <1%, Hindu <1%, Jewish <1%, Muslim <1%, other <1%, none 23.2% (2020 est.)

note: folk religions include religions of African origin, spiritualism, and others intermingled with Catholicism or Protestantism; data is estimative because no authoritative source on religious affiliation exists for Cuba

Dependency ratio
total dependency ratio: 43.3 (2015 est.)
youth dependency ratio: 23.3 (2015 est.)
elderly dependency ratio: 19.9 (2015 est.)
potential support ratio: 5 (2015 est.)

Urbanization
urban population: 77.4% of total population (2022)
rate of urbanization: 0.19% annual rate of change (2020-25 est.)

Life expectancy at birth

total population: 79.64 years. Country comparison to the world: 59th
male: 77.29 years
female: 82.14 years (2022 est.)

total population: 78.9 years. Country comparison to the world: 56th
male: 76.6 years 
female: 81.4 years (2018 est.)

Major infectious diseases
degree of risk: intermediate (2020)
food or waterborne diseases: bacterial diarrhea and hepatitis A
vectorborne diseases: dengue fever

Literacy
definition: age 15 and over can read and write (2015 est.)
total population: 99.8% 
male: 99.9% 
female: 99.8% (2015 est.)

School life expectancy (primary to tertiary education)
total: 14 years
male: 14 years
female: 15 years (2020)

Unemployment, youth ages 15–24
total: 6.1%. Country comparison to the world: 150th
male: 6.4% 
female: 5.6% (2010 est.)

Languages
Spanish (official)

Language 

Spanish is the official language of Cuba. Of all the regional variations of Spanish, Cuban Spanish is most similar to, and originates largely from, the dialect spoken in the Canary Islands. This is a consequence of Canarian migration, which in the 19th and early 20th century was heavy and continuous. There were also migrations of Galicians and Asturians as well, but they did not impact Cuban Spanish to the same degree.

Much of the typical Cuban replacements for standard Spanish vocabulary stems from Canarian lexicon. For example,  (bus) differs from standard Spanish  the former originated in the Canaries and is an onomatopoeia stemming from the sound of a Klaxon horn (wah-wah!). An example of Canarian usage for a Spanish word is the verb  ("to fight"). In standard Spanish the verb would be , while fajar exists as a non-reflexive verb related to the hemming of a skirt.

The second most spoken language of Cuba is Haitian Creole, used mainly by Haitian immigrants and its descendants going back since the late 18th century, of whom fled the Haitian Revolution.

Other languages of Cuba are Cuban Sign Language,  and English is commonly studied as a foreign language.

There are also reports of Lucumi, "Lengua Conga" (Kongo-based liturgical language of the Palo religion) and Bozal Spanish (an "African" socio-dialect of Spanish; now used only in folk religion). Historically, the Ciboney and Classic dialects of Taino and the unattested Guanahatabey were spoken.

Religion

Cuba has a multitude of faiths reflecting the island's diverse cultural elements. Catholicism, which was brought to the island by Spanish colonialists at the beginning of the 16th century, is the most prevalent professed faith. After the revolution, Cuba became an officially atheistic state and restricted religious practice. Since the Fourth Cuban Communist Party Congress in 1991, restrictions have been eased and, according to the National Catholic Observer, direct challenges by state institutions to the right to religion have all but disappeared, though the church still faces restrictions of written and electronic communication, and can only accept donations from state-approved funding sources. The Roman Catholic Church is made up of the Cuban Catholic Bishops' Conference (COCC), led by Jaime Lucas Ortega y Alamino, Cardinal Archbishop of Havana. It has eleven dioceses, 56 orders of nuns and 24 orders of priests. In January 1998, Pope John Paul II paid a historic visit to the island, invited by the Cuban government and Catholic Church.

Afro-Cuban religions, a blend of native African religions and Roman Catholicism, are widely practiced in Cuba. This diversity derives from West and Central Africans who were transported to Cuba, and in effect reinvented their African religions. They did so by combining them with elements of the Catholic belief system, with a result very similar to Brazil. One of these Afro-Cuban religions is Santeria.

Protestantism, introduced from the United States in the 18th century, has seen a steady increase in popularity. 300,000 Cubans belong to the island's 54 Protestant denominations. Pentecostalism has grown rapidly in recent years, and the Assemblies of God alone claims a membership of over 167 000 people. The Episcopal Church of Cuba claims 10,000 adherents. Cuba has small communities of Jews, Muslims, Buddhists and members of the Baháʼí Faith.

Demographic statistics from the CIA World Factbook 

 
Illicit migration is a continuing problem. Cubans attempt to depart the island and enter the US using homemade rafts, alien smugglers, direct flights, or falsified visas; Cubans also use non-maritime routes to enter the US including direct flights to Miami and overland via the southwest US/Mexican border, and islands adjacent to Puerto Rico and the US Virgin Islands.

See also

Cuban American
Afro-Cuban
Haitian Cuban
Isleños
Chinese Cuban
Jewish Cuban
Women in Cuba
Provinces of Cuba

References

The Peninsular (May 2007). Population, birth rate falling in Cuba: Official

External links
Cuba statistics and related publications 

 
Society of Cuba